Chesterfield House was a grand London townhouse built between 1747 and 1752 by Philip Stanhope, 4th Earl of Chesterfield (1694–1773), statesman and man of letters. The exterior was in the Palladian style, the interior Baroque. It stood in Mayfair on the north side of Curzon Street, between South Audley Street and what is now Chesterfield Street. It was demolished in 1937 and on its site now stands an eponymous block of flats. 

The French travel writer Pierre-Jean Grosley in his 1770 book Londres (translated as Tour to London) considered the house to be equal to the hotel particuliers of the nobility in Paris.

History

The house was built on land belonging to Richard Howe, 1st Earl Howe by Isaac Ware. In his "Letters to his Son", Chesterfield wrote from "Hotel Chesterfield" on 31 March 1749: "I have yet finished nothing but my boudoir and my library; the former is the gayest and most cheerful room in England; the latter the best. My garden is now turfed, planted and sown, and will in two months more make a scene of verdure and flowers not common in London."

Library
The Quarterly Review (founded 1809), no. 125, reported:

Staircase

The columns of the screen facing the courtyard and the marble staircase with bronze balustrade came from Cannons, near Edgware, the mansion of James Brydges, 1st Duke of Chandos (d.1744) which was demolished shortly after his death, the materials being sold at auction in 1747. Chesterfield also bought at the auction the  portico and  railings. Chesterfield also furnished his new mansion with artefacts from the sale at Houghton Hall, the country house of Robert Walpole, including an 18-candle copper-gilt lantern. The library was hung with portraits of the earl's ancestors. As a piece of satire concerning the fashion for boasts of ancient ancestry, he placed amongst these portraits two old portraits which he inscribed "Adam de Stanhope" and "Eve de Stanhope".

Creation of Stanhope St
Chesterfield formed Stanhope Street on adjoining land purchased from the Dean and Chapter of Westminster.

Description in 1869

The following description is reproduced in Edward Walford's Old & New London:

George Capel-Coningsby, 5th Earl of Essex (d.1839) remembered seeing the earl sitting on a rustic seat in front of his mansion, basking in the sun.

Sale
Faced with the prospect of demolition in 1869, the house was purchased by the City merchant Charles Magniac, for a reported sum of £175,000. Magniac considerably curtailed the grounds in the rear, and erected a row of  buildings overlooking Chesterfield Street, named Chesterfield Gardens.

The house was later purchased in 1919 by Viscount Lascelles, who later married Princess Mary in 1923. The couple moved out of the house on the weekend of 19-20 December 1931.

See also 
 List of demolished buildings and structures in London
 Ranger's House is the modern name for the house in Greenwich acquired by the 4th Earl in 1748 and renamed Chesterfield House
 Bretby Hall - Derbyshire seat of the Stanhope family

Sources
Walford, Edward. Old & New London: A Narrative of Its History, Its People & Its Places, 6 vols., London, 1878, vol 4, pp. 353–359

References

External links

 Bowles' map of 1775 showing Chesterfield House

Former houses in the City of Westminster
Buildings and structures in Mayfair
Buildings and structures demolished in 1937
Demolished buildings and structures in London